Alessandro "Alex" Caffi (born 18 March 1964) is an Italian racing driver, former Formula One driver, and team owner. He participated in 75 Grands Prix, debuting on 7 September 1986. In 2006 he raced in the inaugural season of the Grand Prix Masters formula for retired Formula One drivers. He currently serves as the team owner of NASCAR Whelen Euro Series team Alex Caffi Motorsport, occasionally doing owner-driver duties as well.

Early life
Caffi was born in Rovato (province of Brescia), in Northern Italy. He spent three years in Italian Formula Three from 1984 to 1986, finishing runner-up in 1984 and 1985, then third in 1986. 1986 also saw him land a one-off drive with the Osella Formula One team.

Formula One career

1980s
1986
Caffi was handed his Formula One debut by Osella, at his, and the team's home race, the Italian Grand Prix, in place of Canadian Allen Berg. Qualifying 27th and last in his FA1H (because of a quirk where for this race, and the following one in Portugal, 27 cars were allowed to start) Caffi drove sensibly and steadily to stay out of trouble and come home last of the runners, albeit six laps down and unclassified.

1987
Osella were impressed by his sensible approach, and signed him for a full season in 1987. The Alfa Romeo-powered FA1I was uncompetitive and unreliable; Caffi finished no races out of 16 and failed to qualify twice, though he was classified once. At the opening round, the Brazilian Grand Prix, Caffi retired after 21 laps due to exhaustion as the heat and physically demanding nature of the car proved too much.

The San Marino Grand Prix, three weeks later, provided Caffi with his only classification of the year, 12th, despite running out of fuel five laps from the finish. Then came a run of 10 consecutive retirements; in Belgium, Monaco, where he qualified an excellent 16th and ran as high as 10th, the United States, where he qualified 19th, France, Great Britain, Germany, Hungary, Austria, Italy and Portugal.

As the season drew to a close, Caffi failed to qualify for two of the final four races in Spain and Australia, bookending retirements in Mexico, where he ran as high as 7th due to attrition, and Japan where he ran out of fuel. Despite finishing so few races, none were down to driver error, though Caffi was unclassified in the Drivers' Championship.

1988
1988 saw Caffi switch to the new Scuderia Italia team. Early season form was thin. Their challenger for the season, the Dallara built and Ford-Cosworth powered F188 was not ready for the first race in Brazil, so to fulfil the championship's requirements of entering every race, a modified Formula 3000 car, the 3087, was used as a stop-gap. Not surprisingly, Caffi failed to pre-qualify.

The new car arrived in time for San Marino, but fortunes failed to improve as Caffi retired and an excellent 17th in qualifying at Monaco was ruined when he crashed all alone on the opening lap, the first blot on his career copybook. Caffi's third retirement in a row in Mexico and failure to qualify in Canada only added to the nightmare.

Mid-season though saw a turnaround in both Caffi's, and the team's season, with four finishes on the spin; 8th in the United States, 12th in France after qualifying 14th, 11th in Great Britain and 15th in Germany after qualifying 19th.

Form during the following five races was patchy. Three top-10 finishes; 8th in Belgium after qualifying 15th, 7th in Portugal (his best career finish at the time) after qualifying 17th and 10th in Spain after qualifying 18th, were scattered around a couple of retirements; in Hungary where he qualified in the top-10 for the first time in 10th, and Italy.

1988 concluded with a brace of retirements in Japan, where he spun off, and after qualifying 11th in Australia. For the second season in a row Caffi was unclassified in the Drivers' Championship.

1989

Scuderia Italia expanded to a two-car outfit for the 1989 season, with fellow Italian Andrea de Cesaris in the second Pirelli shod F189. As with the previous year, Caffi failed to pre-qualify for the opening round in Brazil, but San Marino, next on the calendar, saw Caffi qualify 9th and finish just outside the points in 7th.

Momentum continued onto Monaco with another top-10 in qualifying, 9th, followed by the first Formula One points for himself and the team with an excellent drive to 4th. 13th in Mexico was followed by retirement in the United States, when Caffi, who qualified 6th and at one stage was running 2nd only to Alain Prost, was pushed into the wall rather comically whilst trying to lap teammate Andrea de Cesaris.

A second points finish of 6th in Canada was another highlight but Caffi's season rarely peaked after that with just two finishes in the final 10 races; 7th in Hungary (after qualifying a stunning 3rd) and 9th in Japan.

Failure to finish in France, Germany, Belgium, after spinning off, Italy, Portugal where he qualified 7th then collided with three-time World Drivers' Champion Nelson Piquet, Spain and Australia, where he qualified 10th before spinning off, along with a failure to pre-qualify in Great Britain rounded off an inconsistent year. Four points and 19th in the Drivers' Championship were Caffi's rewards.

1990s
1990
Caffi, by now gaining a reputation as a promising talent, was tempted to Arrows for 1990 as Japan's Footwork Corporation were investing in the team throughout the year (to the extent that Arrows was renamed Footwork from 1991 to 1996) and Porsche had agreed to supply engines to the squad. Caffi was signed to drive the second A11 alongside another Italian, 1985 World Drivers' Championship runner-up Michele Alboreto.

Injury caused by a pre-season cycling accident forced Caffi to sit out the opening race in the United States, with German Bernd Schneider filling the gap. Retirement in Brazil and failure to qualify in San Marino only compounded Caffi's woes.

The following four races were patchy with a 5th, and two points, in Monaco followed by an 8th in Canada, failure to qualify in Mexico and retirement in France. Five consecutive top-10 finishes mid-season; in Great Britain, Germany, Hungary, Belgium and Italy brought about a consistency to Caffi's performance.

His, and everybody's, Portuguese Grand Prix was ended early when he crashed into the Lola of Aguri Suzuki and the resulting foot injuries ruled Caffi out of the next race, Spain, with Schneider once again deputising.

Another positive performance of 9th in Japan was cancelled out by failure to qualify for the final round in Australia. Over the course of the season Caffi scored all the team's points and outperformed the more experienced Alboreto to end 1990 with two points and 16th in the Drivers' Championship.

1991
As Caffi's career gradually rose in stock throughout the previous year, 1991 looked promising for the Italian. Unfortunately, the season turned out to be anything but. The Porsche 3512 V12 was cumbersome and underpowered, whilst both cars, the A11C and the FA12 were little better.

For the first time in his Formula One career, Caffi failed to qualify for any of the opening four races; in the United States, Brazil, San Marino, and Monaco.

The latter would be best remembered for a huge crash in practice, when Caffi slid off line and into the barriers at the Swimming Pool series of corners. The impact was so heavy, the car broke in three; the gearbox and rear wing broke free from the engine, which in turn came clear of the tub. Despite suffering no serious injuries as a result of the crash, Caffi was injured shortly after in a road accident.

As a result, Footwork drafted in Stefan Johansson for the races in Canada, Mexico, France and Great Britain and when Caffi returned to fitness, he discovered the team were trying to keep the Swede on. He managed to regain his seat via a legal injunction, but the struggles re-commenced with failure to qualify in Belgium compounded by pre-qualification failures in Germany, Hungary, Italy, Portugal and Spain.

The season ended on a slightly higher note, as Caffi finished 10th in Japan and kept his head above water to finish 15th in the deluge in Australia. A season of catastrophe yielded no points and no classification in the Drivers' Championship.

1992
Footwork signed Aguri Suzuki to partner Michele Alboreto ahead of the 1992 season and Caffi was, rather abruptly, shown the door. With little time to find a drive, and most seats taken, he had no option but to sign for the new Andrea Moda team, alongside Italian Enrico Bertaggia. The team, owned by shoe-magnate and playboy Andrea Sassetti, had bought out the Coloni squad in 1991 and planned to use their C4 chassis with Judd V10 power for the new season.

However, registration problems with the FIA (involving Sassetti's refusal to pay the $100,000 entrance fee for new teams) meant that Caffi managed no more than a few exploratory laps at the South African Grand Prix, the opening round of 1992. Before the next round in Mexico, the team's new car, the Nick Wirth-designed S921, was built and prepared but freight delays forced Sassetti to withdraw both Caffi and Bertaggia from the Mexican event.

After two races Caffi had had enough, voiced his displeasure of the situation and was fired by Sassetti, with Brazilian super-sub Roberto Moreno taking his seat. No points from both races meant no classification in the Drivers' Championship, but more significantly, it signalled the end of the Italian's Formula One career at the age of 28.

Later life
After F1 he raced on and off in sports and touring cars, mainly in the United States, where in 1998 he had an IRL test at Pikes Peak Raceway. After a brief career in Spanish and Italian Touring Cars, Caffi found his niche in sportscars, racing in GTs, FIA Sportscar, and ALMS. He returned to International motorsport in the IRC Rally Monte-Carlo 2011, driving a Skoda Fabia S2000. 25 years after his Formula 1 career Italian Alex Caffi  won on the streets of the Principality during the Monaco Grand Prix Historique 2016. Caffi was one of the high-profile winners during the 10th running of the GP Historique when he guided the Kessel Racing Ensign N176 to victory in the Pre 1977 3-litre F1 race. He currently owns Alex Caffi Motorsport, a racing team that currently competes in NASCAR Whelen Euro Series, fielding the cars #1 Ford Mustang, #2 Chevrolet Camaro, and #27 Ford Mustang in both Elite 1 and Elite 2.

When he is not racing he is an instructor at the official Subaru Italia safety driving and racing school.

Racing record

Complete Formula One results
(key)

Complete 24 Hours of Le Mans results

Complete Grand Prix Masters results
(key) Races in bold indicate pole position, races in italics indicate fastest lap.

Complete NASCAR results
(key) (Bold – Pole position awarded by qualifying time. Italics – Pole position earned by points standings or practice time. * – Most laps led.)

Whelen Euro Series – Elite 1

References

External links
Official site 

1964 births
Living people
Sportspeople from the Province of Brescia
Italian racing drivers
Italian Formula One drivers
Arrows Formula One drivers
Andrea Moda Formula One drivers
Scuderia Italia Formula One drivers
Osella Formula One drivers
Italian Formula Three Championship drivers
Grand Prix Masters drivers
24 Hours of Le Mans drivers
American Le Mans Series drivers
European Le Mans Series drivers
Porsche Supercup drivers
World Sportscar Championship drivers
24 Hours of Spa drivers
24 Hours of Daytona drivers
NASCAR drivers
Scuderia Coloni drivers